"Lonely Boy" is a song by American rock band the Black Keys. It is the opening track from their 2011 studio album El Camino and was released as the record's lead single on October 26, 2011. The song is also the A-side of a promotional 12-inch single that was released in commemoration of Record Store Day's "Back to Black" Friday event. The single was accompanied by a popular one-shot music video of a man dancing and lip-synching the lyrics.

"Lonely Boy" became one of the group's most successful singles. It topped several rock radio charts, including the Alternative Songs and Rock Songs charts in the US, and the Alternative Rock and Active Rock charts in Canada. On the singles charts, "Lonely Boy" was the group's highest-charting song in several countries, peaking at number 64 on the Billboard Hot 100, number two on the Australian Singles Chart, and number 33 on the Canadian Hot 100. At the 55th Annual Grammy Awards, the song won awards for Best Rock Performance and Best Rock Song, while also receiving a nomination for Record of the Year.

Composition
"Lonely Boy" is 3:13 in length. The song was written by Dan Auerbach and Patrick Carney with producer Danger Mouse. The song is played in the key of E minor, with only three chords used throughout the song. "Lonely Boy" is set in the time signature of common time with a  tempo of 168 beats per minute. According to Auerbach, the guitar riff was inspired by Johnny Burnette's cover of "Train Kept A-Rollin'". The guitar line features a dive bomb although Auerbach uses a Boss Super Shifter pedal to achieve the effect.

Release

Music video
The promotional music video for "Lonely Boy" features actor, musician and part-time security guard Derrick T. Tuggle dancing and lip-syncing to the song in front of the Pepper Tree Motel in North Hollywood, a neighborhood of Los Angeles, California. The video, shot in a single take, went viral and garnered more than 400,000 views on YouTube within 24 hours. The video originally had a script and a cast of more than 40 people, but the group was not pleased with the results. Auerbach said, "A couple of weeks after we shot it they sent us the edit and it was awful. We sent it back... they sent us another edit and it was terrible. That's when we said 'what about that one guy, the extra who had that one dance scene' and that's the video – the most expensive single shot ever recorded." Tuggle was originally cast as an extra who would be handed a set of keys to the band's motel room by Auerbach and Carney. While on set, Tuggle's improvised dancing drew the attention of director Jesse Dylan. He said, "The director just sort of noticed me dancing and asked me, 'Can you perform?' I said, 'I can dance, anybody can dance,' so I took some moves from everybody: John Travolta from Saturday Night Fever and Pulp Fiction, the Carlton Banks dance from The Fresh Prince and a little bit of Michael Jackson, so it was a smorgasbord of everybody in there." He added, "It was just a spur-of-the-moment thing. My acting teacher Mark McPherson, he has us do this thing before we start class called 'Song and Dance,' where he'll have us sing one of our favorite songs, and then while we're singing it, he'll have us do a crazy dance, or a sexy dance, and I guess it spawned from that." The video was nominated for a 2012 MTV Video Music Award for Best Rock Video. Tuggle's performance later earned him a cameo appearance in the music video for "Happy" by Pharrell Williams.

Cover art
The cover of the single release features an image of a bulldozer sitting on an empty tract of land. The lot was previously filled by the factory at which the group's 2004 album Rubber Factory was recorded. Michael Carney, the group's art director, went to take a photo of the factory but found that it had been demolished. Auerbach joked about the cover's significance: "We keep stumbling into these profound artistic expressions. That's how we roll though."

Commercial performance
"Lonely Boy" became one of the group's most successful singles. It topped several rock radio charts, including the Alternative Songs and Rock Songs charts in the US (the second such Black Keys song to top both), and the Alternative Rock and Active Rock charts in Canada. On the Hot Mainstream Rock Tracks chart, it has become their highest-charting song, peaking at number five. On the singles charts, it became the band's highest-charting song in several countries, reaching a peak of number 64 on the US Billboard Hot 100 (which beats the number 87 peak achieved by 2010's "Tighten Up"), number two on the Australian Singles Chart, and number 33 on the Canadian Hot 100. The song was certified nine-times platinum in Canada, triple-platinum in Australia, platinum in New Zealand, and gold in Denmark.

Reception

Critical reaction
In a review of the single, Rolling Stone gave the song four out of five stars, saying that "Frustrated desire is the song's ostensible theme... but for Keys fans, this is a clean hit of instant gratification." Its review of El Camino praised the song's arrangement, particularly the "sugar-crusted keyboard" that, along with the chorus, "chang[es] the swampy chug into a seductive singalong". James Lachno of The Daily Telegraph said the song "blends Steppenwolf's road-tripping aesthetic with the proto-punk of the Modern Lovers" and was an example of how a "broader collage of influences allows the duo to fashion a more distinctive sound". Pitchfork Media reviewer Rob Harvilla called it a "surging opener" and highlighted the "machine-gun surge of Dan Auerbach's gong-banging guitar". Kitty Empire of The Observer wrote, "It's hard to resist the taut and catchy single".

Accolades
Readers of Rolling Stone voted "Lonely Boy" the third-best song of 2011 in an end-of-year poll. Paste ranked it number 20 on its list of "The 50 Best Songs of 2011". The song placed second on the Triple J Hottest 100, 2011 poll of the most popular songs in Australia. According to AirCheck, "Lonely Boy" was the most-played song on Australian radio in 2012, logging more than 884 hours of playtime.

At the 55th Annual Grammy Awards, "Lonely Boy" was nominated for Best Rock Performance, Best Rock Song and Record of the Year, winning the first two.

Use in popular media

The song has been used for the UFC Primetime event, UFC on Fox: Velasquez vs. Dos Santos, and in the soundtracks for Need for Speed: The Run and Forza Horizon. It was also used in a highlights package prior to the Italy vs. England match in the 2012 Six Nations and for Drew Brees and Alex Smith in the pregame before a 2011 NFL Divisional Playoff game between Brees' New Orleans Saints and Smith's San Francisco 49ers. It also featured on Channel 4 Racing during their preview of a big race where Jim McGrath talked through the runners.

During the midpoint of the 2011–12 NHL season, it has been the goal song for the Buffalo Sabres and Edmonton Oilers. For most of the 2011–12 NHL season, it has been the song played when the New York Rangers come onto the ice before home games.

On TV, the song was featured in episodes of Workaholics, Eastbound & Down and Hawaii Five-0, the first episode of 24/7 Flyers/Rangers: Road to the NHL Winter Classic, the twelfth episode of season three, "The Ties That Bind", on The Vampire Diaries, the episode "Broken" of Criminal Minds, and in the opening sequence for episode one in the Australian TV show Underbelly: Badness. It was also used in 2012 commercials for the launch of the A&E in Australia and Lee.

In movies, it was most recently heard in the trailers for the 2013 zombie comedy Warm Bodies, the 2014 family comedy Alexander and the Terrible, Horrible, No Good, Very Bad Day, and the 2016 monster action comedy film Monster Trucks.

Ellen DeGeneres danced to this song with her audience as the opening dance on an episode of The Ellen DeGeneres Show in the fall of 2012.

The Free Beer and Hot Wings Show uses a sample of the song at times to bring the show back from commercial break.

In 2014, the Austrian company A1 Telekom Austria used "Lonely Boy" for advertisement.

Spanish TV show Late Motiv used a version of it performed by its house band as its opening theme.

In 2018, eBay used an instrumental version of this song for their UK ad campaign.

Was used as the official theme for talkSPORT radio station

Track listing

Personnel
 Dan Auerbach – guitars, vocals
 Patrick Carney – drums
 Danger Mouse – production, bass guitar, keyboards

Additional personnel:
 Leisa Hans – backing vocals
 Heather Rigdon – backing vocals
 Ashley Wilcoxson – backing vocals

Charts

Weekly charts

Year-end charts

Decade-end charts

Certifications

Notes

References

The Black Keys songs
Songs written by Dan Auerbach
Songs written by Patrick Carney
2011 singles
Grammy Award for Best Rock Song
Songs about loneliness